Demetris Stylianou (born July 5, 1984 in Nicosia, Cyprus) is a Cypriot football goalkeeper who currently plays for P.O. Xylotymbou in the Cypriot Second Division.

He has a twin brother, Loukas Stylianou who plays for Chalkanoras Idaliou.

International career
Stylianou got his first call up to the senior Cyprus side for 2018 FIFA World Cup qualifiers against Greece and Bosnia and Herzegovina in October 2016.

References

External links
 weltfussball.de  

1984 births
Association football goalkeepers
Living people
Cypriot footballers
Cypriot twins
Twin sportspeople
Olympiakos Nicosia players
AEL Limassol players
Ethnikos Achna FC players
Aris Limassol FC players
Alki Larnaca FC players
Ermis Aradippou FC players
Nea Salamis Famagusta FC players
P.O. Xylotymbou players
Cyprus under-21 international footballers
Cypriot First Division players